Izak Cornelis Eric Wesdorp (15 February 1947 – 17 October 2017) was a Dutch rower. He competed at the 1968 Summer Olympics in the eight event and finished in eights place. After retiring from competitions he worked as a rowing coach, particularly with Chun Wei Cheung.

References

1947 births
2017 deaths
Dutch male rowers
Olympic rowers of the Netherlands
Rowers at the 1968 Summer Olympics
Rowers from Amsterdam
20th-century Dutch people